Workers' Cause Party (PCO) is a political party in Brazil. Its origins can be traced back to 1978. On that year, several Trotskyist activists who were not satisfied with the socialist international united under the name Tendência Trotskista do Brasil (Brazilian Trotskyist Tendency, TTB). However, the registered party was only established in 1995. Its electoral number is 29.

History

In 1980, this organization united itself with the newly formed Workers' Party (PT), becoming very involved in that decade's municipal and state elections, with several mayors and state representatives elected.

In 1990 and 1991, however, several TTB members were expelled from the PT due to their non-commitment to the Party's statutes. After that, the PCO was officially organized and founded in 1995.

In 2006, the candidacy of Rui Costa Pimenta to presidency was abrogated by the Superior Electoral Court.

In 2018, PCO supported the bid of Luiz Inácio Lula da Silva (PT), Fernando Haddad (PT) and Manuela D'Ávilla (PCdoB) informally and critically, refusing the invitation to compose the coalition (PT, PCdoB and PROS) officially.

In 2020, PCO suffered a cyber attack resulting in the loss of more than four thousand articles in its website.

In August 2021, PCO expressed support to the Taliban about their "victory over American imperialism", considering it "a victory for all oppressed people". The party has also praised Osama bin Laden, the leader of Al-Qaeda, describing him as "an example of selflessness, conviction, disposition" in the struggle for "the freedom of his people".

In 2022, the PCO supported the pre-candidacy of Luiz Inácio Lula da Silva in the upcoming 2022 Brazilian general election in the coalition Let's go together for Brazil.

Youth wing
The youth wing of the party is the Revolutionary Youth Alliance (AJR), which publishes the magazine Revista Juventude Revolucionária.

Ideology 
PCO is favourable to the socialism, due to the capitalist exploitation of the workers, and to a land reform without indemnity.

The party is opposed to gun control policies, saying that "The bourgeoisie is armed. It has the army, the police and all other organs of repression, public or private. The people have nothing. It is defenseless in the face of the war machine of his enemies who control the State".

The party interpret the Impeachment of Dilma Rousseff (PT) as a coup'd etát.

During the COVID-19 pandemic, PCO supported vaccination efforts while opposing to the mandatory vaccination.

Electoral history

Presidential elections

Legislative elections

Newspapers and magazines 

 Jornal da Causa Operária (JCO) - Physical newspaper
 Diário da Causa Operária (DCO) - Current virtual newspaper
 Causa Operária TV - Official YouTube channel
 Rádio Causa Operária - Official radio station
 Revista Juventude Revolucionária - Revolutionary Youth Alliance magazine

References

1995 establishments in Brazil
Anti-imperialism
Socialist parties in Brazil
Political parties established in 1995
Far-left politics in Brazil
Trotskyist organisations in Brazil
Far-left political parties
Anti-Americanism